Enock Mwepu (born 1 January 1998) is a Zambian former professional footballer who played as a midfielder.

Having begun his career in his native Zambia, Mwepu signed for Austrian club Red Bull Salzburg in 2017 before moving to join Premier League club Brighton & Hove Albion in 2021. Mwepu represented and captained the Zambia national team. On October 10 2022, he was forced to retire following the discovery of a hereditary heart condition.

Club career

Early career
Mwepu's career began with Kafue Celtic in Lusaka before being identified with the 2013 Airtel Rising Stars. During the 2015–16 season, Mwepu had little game time with Power Dynamos football club of Copperbelt; this precipitated into a move to NAPSA Stars at the end of the 2016 season.

Salzburg and loan to Liefering
In June 2017, Mwepu joined Red Bull Salzburg and was loaned out to Salzburg's feeder club Liefering who play in Austrian Football First League. During the 2019–20 season, Mwepu established himself amongst Salzburg's starting eleven. He made his debut in the UEFA Champions League during a 4–3 loss to Liverpool at Anfield. On 18 December 2019, Mwepu extended his contract with Salzburg until summer 2024.

Brighton & Hove Albion
On 6 July 2021, he joined Premier League side Brighton & Hove Albion on a four-year contract, for an undisclosed fee. He scored in a 3–1 pre-season friendly win at Luton Town on 31 July.

He made his competitive Albion debut on 14 August in the opening game of the 2021–22 season away at Burnley where he was replaced by Adam Lallana at half time of the eventual 2–1 victory at Turf Moor. On 24 August, Mwepu assisted Jakub Moder's first Albion goal in the second round EFL Cup away fixture at Cardiff City where Albion won 2–0. He scored his first goal for The Seagulls on 27 October, putting them back level to 2–2 in an eventual penalty shootout loss – in which his penalty was saved – away at Leicester City in the EFL Cup. Three days later, he scored his first league goal for the Sussex side, inspiring Brighton's come back with a stunning 25–yard strike in an eventual 2–2 away draw against Liverpool.

Mwepu had a slow start to 2022 and in general to his time in Sussex due to injury and illness, thus had limited playing time. On his first start since his return from injury Mwepu scored and made an assist for Trossard's opener in the 2–1 away win at Arsenal on 9 April, to help Brighton end their seven match run without a victory. Graham Potter spoke that Mwepu has a "slight injury in his groin which probably means that will be him for the rest of the season," after picking up the knock during the 3–0 away victory at Wolves on 30 April. His debut season with The Seagulls was marred by injuries though he had made a positive impact and at the club's end of season awards Mwepu won Goal of the Season for his strike at Liverpool in October. Mwepu managed to recover in time to appear as a substitute in the last game of the season, a 3–1 home victory over West Ham, with Brighton achieving their highest top flight finish in ninth place.

On 10 October 2022, Mwepu retired from professional football at the age of 24 after being diagnosed with a rare hereditary heart condition.

International career
In 2014 Mwepu was part of the Zambia national under-17 team that represented the country at the 2015 African U-17 Championship, where Zambia played Niger, Nigeria and Guinea from group A. Mwepu is known for his versatility in the field of play as demonstrated at the 2017 Under-20 Africa Cup of Nations in Zambia, where he scored a goal and was among the best substitutes of the tournament.

Mwepu scored his first international goal for Zambia in an AFCON Qualifier against Algeria on 2 September 2017 at the National Heroes Stadium in Lusaka, a match which Zambia won 3–1.

Coaching career 
After retiring from professional football due to his heart condition, Brighton announced on 30 December that Mwepu had been appointed to serve in the role of under-9s coach in their academy from January 2023.

Personal life 
His younger brother Francisco Mwepu is also a professional footballer.

In January 2023, it was confirmed that Mwepu was in hospital in Zambia after a suspected heart attack, coming just a few months after being forced to retire from football due to a  hereditary heart condition. Brighton football club announced he was receiving precautionary checks thanking people for their support, but the club and Enock do not wish to comment further at this stage.

Career statistics

Club

International goals
Scores and results list Zambia's goal tally first, score column indicates score after each Mwepu goal.

Honours
Red Bull Salzburg
Austrian Bundesliga: 2017–18, 2018–19, 2019–20, 2020–21
Austrian Cup: 2018–19, 2019–20, 2020–21

Zambia U20
Africa U-20 Cup of Nations: 2017
COSAFA U-20 Cup: 2016

Individual
Austrian  Bundesliga Team of the Year: 2020–21
Brighton & Hove Albion Goal of the Season: 2021–22

References

1998 births
Living people
Sportspeople from Lusaka
Zambian footballers
Zambia youth international footballers
Zambia under-20 international footballers
Zambia international footballers
Association football midfielders
NAPSA Stars F.C. players
Austrian Football Bundesliga players
FC Red Bull Salzburg players
2. Liga (Austria) players
FC Liefering players
Brighton & Hove Albion F.C. players
Premier League players
2019 Africa U-23 Cup of Nations players
Zambian expatriate footballers
Expatriate footballers in Austria
Expatriate footballers in England
Zambian expatriate sportspeople in Austria
Zambian expatriate sportspeople in England
Association football coaches
Brighton & Hove Albion F.C. non-playing staff